Sergei Nikolaevich Drozd (born 14 April 1990) is a Belarusian professional ice hockey player who participated at the 2010 IIHF World Championship as a member of the Belarus National men's ice hockey team.  He currently plays for Yunost Minsk in the Belarusian Extraliga (BXL). He has formerly played for HC Dinamo Minsk in the Kontinental Hockey League (KHL).

References

External links

1990 births
Living people
Belarusian ice hockey right wingers
HC Dinamo Minsk players
Keramin Minsk players
Ice hockey people from Minsk
HK Neman Grodno players
Shinnik Bobruisk players
Tri-City Americans players